Mai Sijing (born 17 April 1991) is a Chinese footballer currently playing as a forward for Zibo Cuju.

Career statistics

Club
.

References

1991 births
Living people
Sportspeople from Shenzhen
Footballers from Guangdong
Chinese footballers
Chinese expatriate footballers
Association football forwards
Hong Kong First Division League players
China League Two players
China League One players
Shenzhen F.C. players
Shaanxi Chang'an Athletic F.C. players
Zibo Cuju F.C. players
Chinese expatriate sportspeople in Hong Kong
Expatriate footballers in Hong Kong
21st-century Chinese people